The Finnish Aviation Museum is a museum specialising in aircraft, located near Helsinki Airport in Veromies, Vantaa, Finland.

History
The Aviation Museum Society was founded on 4 December 1969. Opened in 1972, the museum was initially located in the basement of the Helsinki Airport terminal but received its own facilities in 1981.  The museum has constantly expanded and today has an office wing, research rooms, aviation library, archive, and an auditorium for 200 people.

Currently the museum is owned by the Finnish Aviation Museum Foundation, founded in 1996.

Exhibition
The museum displays some 9,600 items, and the library has over 16,000 books  and 160,000 aviation-related magazines. Furthermore, the museum has a large collection of flight instruction and service books. There are also some 78,000 photographs, negatives, and slides. The archive spans some 1,800 shelf metres.

The whole collection comprises some 80 aircraft, of which 22 are gliders. The following is a list of some of the more noteworthy aircraft:

A complete list can be found at the museum's web page.

See also

 Helsinki Air Show 2017
 List of aerospace museums
 List of museums in Finland

References

External links

 The Finnish Aviation Museum
 The Aviation Museum Society 

Aerospace museums in Finland
Buildings and structures in Vantaa
Museums in Uusimaa